Duncan MacMillan or Duncan Macmillan may refer to:
 Duncan Macmillan (playwright), a British playwright and director. 
 Duncan Macmillan (art historian), Scottish academic and writer
 Duncan Macmillan (athlete) (1890–1963), British track and field athlete competitor in the 1912 Summer Olympics
 Duncan MacMillan (Bloomberg), co-founder of Bloomberg L.P.
 Duncan Macmillan (Canadian politician) (1837–1903), Canadian lawyer and Member of Parliament
 Duncan MacMillan (Nova Scotia politician) (1897–1969), former Nova Scotia politician
 Duncan Bruce MacMillan, former Alberta politician

See also
 Duncan McMillan (disambiguation)
 Duncan MacMillan High School, a secondary school in Sheet Harbour, Nova Scotia, Canada
 Duncan MacMillan Nursing Home in Sheet Harbour, Nova Scotia, Canada